The Czech Republic participated in the Eurovision Song Contest 2009 with the song "Aven Romale" written by Radoslav "Gipsy" Banga. The song was performed by the group Gipsy.cz, which was internally selected by the Czech broadcaster Česká televize (ČT) to represent the nation at the 2009 contest in Moscow, Russia. Gipsy.cz was announced as the Czech entrant on 30 January 2009, while ČT organised the national final Eurosong 2009 in order to select the song that Gipsy.cz would perform. Two songs were presented on 28 February 2009 and the public had until 14 March to vote for their favourite song, which resulted in "Aven Romale" as the Czech entry on 14 March 2009.

Czech Republic was drawn to compete in the first semi-final of the Eurovision Song Contest which took place on 12 May 2009. Performing during the show in position 2, "Aven Romale" was not announced among the 10 qualifying entries of the first semi-final and therefore did not qualify to compete in the final. It was later revealed that Czech Republic placed eighteenth (last) out of the 18 participating countries in the semi-final failing to score any points. This marked the first time the Czech Republic had scored nul points since they debuted in the contest in 2007.

Background 

The nation competed in the contest on two consecutive occasions between 2007 and 2008 without qualifying to the final: in 2007 Kabát performing "Malá dáma" placed 28th (last) in the semi-final achieving only one point, while in 2008 Tereza Kerndlová performed "Have Some Fun" and placed 18th (second to last) in her semi-final scoring nine points.

The Czech national broadcaster, Česká televize (ČT), broadcasts the event within Czech Republic and organises the selection process for the nation's entry. The broadcaster has used national finals to select the Czech Eurovision entry on both occasions. ČT confirmed their intentions to participate at the 2009 Eurovision Song Contest in July 2008. The broadcaster later confirmed in January 2009 that the Czech artist for the 2009 contest would be selected internally, while the song would be selected through a national final.

Before Eurovision

Eurosong 2009 
The Czech artist for the Eurovision Song Contest 2009 was selected internally by ČT. On 30 January 2009, the broadcaster announced that the group Gipsy.cz would represent the Czech Republic in Moscow. Gipsy.cz previously attempted to represent the Czech Republic at the Eurovision Song Contest by competing in the national finals in 2007 and 2008, both placing in the top three with the songs "Muloland" and "Benga Beating", respectively. In addition to the announcement of Gipsy.cz as the Czech representative, ČT announced that the national final Eurosong 2009 would be organised in order to select their song.

Two songs titled "Aven Romale" and "Do You Wanna", both of then which were written by Gipsy.cz member Radoslav Banga, were submitted by the group and announced during a press conference on 16 February 2009. The two songs were presented to the public via the release of their official music videos, both directed by Cosmoboy, during the ČT2 programme Noc s Andělem on 28 February 2009 and the public was able to vote for their favourite song via SMS between 1 and 14 March 2009. The winning song, "Aven Romale", was announced on 14 March 2009 during Noc s Andělem. "Aven Romale" was the first song to have featured lyrics in the Romani language at the Eurovision Song Contest.

Promotion 
Gipsy.cz specifically promoted "Aven Romale" as the Czech Eurovision entry on 8 March 2009 by performing during the final of the Slovak Eurosong 2009 Eurovision national final. The group also performed during the ČT Anděl Music Awards on 21 March, which was held at the Top Hotel in Prague and broadcast on ČT1.

At Eurovision

According to Eurovision rules, all nations with the exceptions of the host country and the "Big Four" (France, Germany, Spain and the United Kingdom) are required to qualify from one of two semi-finals in order to compete for the final; the top nine songs from each semi-final as determined by televoting progress to the final, and a tenth was determined by back-up juries. The European Broadcasting Union (EBU) split up the competing countries into six different pots based on voting patterns from previous contests, with countries with favourable voting histories put into the same pot. On 30 January 2009, a special allocation draw was held which placed each country into one of the two semi-finals. Czech Republic was placed into the first semi-final, to be held on 12 May 2009. The running order for the semi-finals was decided through another draw on 16 March 2009 and Estonia was set to perform in position 2, following the entry from Montenegro and before the entry from Belgium.

In the Czech Republic, the first semi-final and the final were broadcast on ČT1 and featured commentary by Jan Rejžek. The Czech spokesperson, who announced the Czech votes during the final, was Petra Šubrtová.

Semi-final 
Gipsy.cz took part in technical rehearsals on 3 and 7 May, followed by dress rehearsals on 11 and 12 May. The Czech performance featured the members of Gipsy.cz appearing on stage with lead singer Radoslav "Gipsy" Banga who played the character "Super Gipsy" wearing a red costume with yellow stripes. The LED screens displayed comic strip pictures depicting "Super Gipsy" with a Parental Advisory label, a dustbin and a barcode shown in the background.

At the end of the show, Czech Republic was not announced among the top 10 entries in the first semi-final and therefore failed to qualify to compete in the final. It was later revealed that Czech Republic placed eighteenth (last) in the semi-final, receiving a total of 0 points. This marked the first time the Czech Republic had scored zero points since they debuted in the contest in 2007, and the sixteenth time in the history of the contest a song had received nul points.

Voting 
The voting system for 2009 involved each country awarding points from 1-8, 10 and 12, with the points in the final being decided by a combination of 50% national jury and 50% televoting. Each nation's jury consisted of five music industry professionals who are citizens of the country they represent. This jury judged each entry based on: vocal capacity; the stage performance; the song's composition and originality; and the overall impression by the act. In addition, no member of a national jury was permitted to be related in any way to any of the competing acts in such a way that they cannot vote impartially and independently.

Below is a breakdown of points awarded to Czech Republic and awarded by Czech Republic in the first semi-final and grand final of the contest. The nation awarded its 12 points to Armenia in the semi-final and the final of the contest.

Points awarded to the Czech Republic
The Czech Republic scored zero points at the 2009 Eurovision Song Contest.

Points awarded by the Czech Republic

Detailed voting results
The following members comprised the Czech jury:

 Andrea Savane
 Petr Čáp
 Jitka Benešová
 Michal Dvořák
 Vladimir Vlasák

After Eurovision 

References

External links 
 Official Czech Eurovision site

2009
Countries in the Eurovision Song Contest 2009
Eurovision